Route 364 is a Quebec provincial highway located in the Laurentides region. It runs from the junction of Autoroute 15 in the village of Saint-Sauveur, one of the major touristic villages in the Laurentides and ends in Amherst at the junction of Route 323. It overlaps Route 329 in Morin Heights and Route 327 from Weir to Arundel. Although well-maintained for most of its run, the approaches to Lac-des-Seize-Îles and Weir are marked by severe gradients, tight curves and are considered dangerous.

Towns along Route 364

 Saint-Sauveur
 Morin-Heights
 Saint-Adolphe-d'Howard
 Montcalm
 Lac-des-Seize-Îles
 Arundel
 Huberdeau
 Amherst

See also
 List of Quebec provincial highways

References

External links  
 Official Transports Quebec Map 
 Route 364 on Google Maps

364